Michael Bull is a professor in Sound Studies in the Department of Media and Film at the University of Sussex, England.

Background
Bull is one of the founders of the academic discipline of "sound studies". He has published research on mobile communications, music and sound in urban culture and is often quoted by journalists penning articles about mobile technology devices and was dubbed "Professor iPod" by Wired Magazine.
Bull published the books: Sounding Out the City and Sound Moves, iPod Culture and Urban Experience. Bull is Editor of the journal Senses and Society and the book Sound Studies: Critical Concepts in Media and Cultural Studies.

Notes

External links
 Michael Bull, University of Sussex page

Academics of the University of Sussex
Living people
Mass media theorists
Year of birth missing (living people)